Ethan Chidiebere Nwaneri (born 21 March 2007) is an English footballer who plays as a midfielder for Premier League club Arsenal.

Nwaneri made his Premier League debut against Brentford in September 2022, becoming the youngest ever Arsenal player, and the youngest player to appear in the top flight of English football.

Early life
Ethan Chidiebere Nwaneri was born on 21 March 2007 in England and attends St John's Senior School in Enfield. He is of Nigerian descent.

Career
Nwaneri joined Arsenal at nine years-old. By the age of 14, he was already playing for their under-18 side. Predominantly, he plays as a midfielder.

Nwaneri started the 2022–23 season playing for Arsenal under-18s, but he was quickly advanced to the club's under-21 side. Having made a sole appearance in the 2022–23 Premier League 2, he joined the first team for training in September, and made his first senior matchday squad on 18 September when he was named as a substitute for the Premier League match against Brentford. Coming off the bench to replace Fábio Vieira in second-half stoppage time, he became the youngest player to ever appear in the Premier League – breaking the record previously held by Harvey Elliott, and the all-time English top-flight record held since August 1964 by former Sunderland goalkeeper Derek Forster, by three days. He also became Arsenal's youngest-ever player in any competition, breaking the previous record of 16 years and 177 days, set by Cesc Fàbregas in the 2003–04 League Cup. In the post-match press conference, manager Mikel Arteta explained that they had to name Nwaneri and two other under-21 players on the bench because the first team had several injuries, especially the injury of midfielder and captain Martin Ødegaard, and a "gut feeling" was behind his decision to send Nwaneri on.

Style of play
Nwaneri has been labelled as a player who can operate as a "number 10" but can play every attacking position, with an innate capacity to receive and dribble with the ball at his feet while also contributing defensively. He is comfortable in both wide and central roles.

Career statistics

References

External links

2007 births
Living people
English footballers
Association football midfielders
Arsenal F.C. players
Premier League players
England youth international footballers
Black British sportsmen
English sportspeople of Nigerian descent